The 1985–86 season was the 87th season for FC Barcelona.

Squad

La Liga

League table

Matches

Supercopa

Copa del Rey

Eightfinals

Quarterfinals

Semifinals

Final

European Cup

Second round

Eightfinals

Quarterfinals

Semifinals

Final

Copa de la Liga

Eightfinals

Quarterfinals

Semifinals

Final

Friendlies

External links

webdelcule.com

FC Barcelona seasons
Barcelona